HD 37289, also known as HR 1916, is a solitary, orange hued star located in the northern circumpolar constellation Camelopardalis. It has an apparent magnitude of 5.61, making it faintly visible to the naked eye under ideal conditions. Based on parallax measurements from the Gaia spacecraft, the object is estimated to be 308 light years distant.

HD 37289 has a stellar classification of K5 III, indicating that it is an evolved red giant. Gaia DR3 stellar evolution models place it on the red giant branch. This means that it is currently fusing a hydrogen shell around an inert helium core. HD 37289 has been calculated to have a metallicity approximately around solar level.

References

Camelopardalis (constellation)
K-type giants
037289
026882
1916
BD+65 00485